Losna is an island in the municipality of Solund in Vestland county, Norway. The  island lies at the mouth of the Sognefjorden, on the north side of the Sognesjøen. The Tollesundet strait lies between the island and the mainland of Hyllestad to the east and the Krakhellasundet strait lies between the island and the nearby island of Sula to the west.

The island's residents live on the southeastern side of the island, in and around the small village of Losnegard.  The only access to the island is by boat, and there are ferry routes from Rutledal to the south in Gulen and to the village of Krakhella on the island of Sula to the west.  The island was part of the municipality of Gulen until 1964 when it was administratively transferred to the municipality of Solund.  At the beginning of the 1900s, there were about 100 permanent residents of the island, but in 2001, there were only 4 permanent residents left.

See also
List of islands of Norway

References

Islands of Vestland
Solund